There are two species of skink named Taylor's short-legged skink endemic to the Philippines:
 Brachymeles taylori
 Brachymeles vermis